"Free the World" is a single by American singer La Toya Jackson. Jackson spent six years in seclusion after divorcing her abusive late ex-husband and manager, Jack Gordon, in 1997. After her years in exile, the September 11th attacks inspired Jackson to write "Free the World". She recorded and performed it for friends, who immediately fell in love with it. This led to the revival of Jackson's 25-year-old music career.

This song led Jackson to begin work on her Startin' Over album, which included "Just Wanna Dance" as the lead single. "Free the World" was released as a follow-up and charted in March 2005. The single peaked at #24 on the Billboard Hot Dance Club Play charts.

The song is an appeal to free the world from segregation, discrimination and years of war. VH1 described the ballad as the "most appropriate song for the world." About.com dubbed Jason Randolph's remix a "trippily hypnotic treat" with a "churning rhythm track and mesmerizing synth."

Chart

Track listings
US promotional CD
 Extended House Mix
 Radio Remix
 Dub Mix
 Album Version
 Original Album Remix

US 12" vinyl #TOY2 
"Free The World" (Radio Remix)
"Free The World" (Dub)
"Free The World" (Extended House Mix)

References

2005 singles
La Toya Jackson songs
Pop ballads
2001 songs
Songs written by La Toya Jackson
Music about the September 11 attacks